Meneuz-Moskva (Mänäwez-Mäskäw) is a rural locality (a selo) in Kosh-Yelginsky Selsoviet, Bizhbulyaksky District, Bashkortostan, Russia. The population was 261 as of 2010. There are 9 streets.

Geography 
Meneuz-Moskva is located 49 km north of Bizhbulyak (the district's administrative centre) by road. Yermolkino is the nearest rural locality.

References 

Rural localities in Bizhbulyaksky District